Applemore College is a secondary school in Hampshire, England, situated in the village of Dibden Purlieu on the edge of the New Forest. It offers education to over 600 students between the ages of 11 and 16 and has specialist subject status for the teaching of Technology.

Introduction
The college was built in 1969 as a comprehensive co-educational school. It became one of the first Technology Colleges in 1994. Roland Marsh was appointed Headteacher in September 2009 and in the Ofsted report for 2013 the school maintained an overall rating of "good". Roland Marsh retired in 2020 and was succeeded by Alan Chipping, who had previously been deputy head.

Ofsted feedback 
In the 2013 Ofsted inspection, Applemore College maintained an overall rating of “good”. Special mention was given to the school's pastoral care, with the report stating ‘the school provides outstanding care for its students and relationships throughout the school are strong. Consequently, the great majority of students behave well, feel safe and are happy to come to school.'

Personal development and wellbeing
Personal tutors have an overview of both the academic and the personal development of a group of students and are the first point of contact for parents. Each Year group is overseen by an experienced Progress Leader giving academic and pastoral guidance. Additionally, the Student Welfare team offers specialist support and advice as required and in 2015 received an AcSEED award for supporting emotional wellbeing in school and a Silver Young Carers in Schools Award.

Sports and extracurricular activities
A full-size, floodlit artificial grass sports pitch located on Applemore College's playing fields, opened in 2016. This was installed due to funding from Sport England's Improvement Fund, the Premier League & The FA Facilities Fund, which is delivered by the Football Foundation, the Armed Forces Community Covenant Grant Scheme, the Rugby Football Union, New Forest District Council, Hampshire County Council and the Barker Mill Foundation.
The pitch serves students of Applemore College and those studying at Oak Lodge School and Greenwood School as well as local post-16 Colleges and Primary Schools. Out of school hours, this community resource is available for use by the military, community groups and local football and rugby club teams (including Hythe & Dibden Youth FC and Fawley Rugby Club).
Sporting and educational trips providing a range of personal development opportunities are offered for all Year groups to participate in.
Various House events are held throughout the year for all students and members of staff to participate in and an extensive extra-curricular programme, which was commented on by Ofsted 2013, culminates with the Year 11 Prom where the students celebrate their time at Applemore.

Secondary schools in Hampshire
Foundation schools in Hampshire